Ohio is a state located in the Midwestern United States. Cities in Ohio are municipalities whose population is greater than 5,000; smaller municipalities are called villages. Nonresident college students and incarcerated inmates do not count towards the city requirement of 5,000 residents. There are currently 253 cities and 673 villages in Ohio, for a total of 926 municipalities.

Municipality names are not unique: there is a village of Centerville in Gallia County and a city of Centerville in Montgomery County; there is also a city of Oakwood in Montgomery County as well as the villages of Oakwood in Cuyahoga County and Oakwood in Paulding County. Bay Village and The Village of Indian Hill are cities despite the word "Village" in their names, and 16 villages have "City" in their names.

The largest city by population is Columbus with  905,748 residents.

List

See also 
 Administrative divisions of Ohio
 List of cities in the United States
 List of counties in Ohio
 List of townships in Ohio

References

 
Ohio, List of cities in
Cities